Gabriel Correa may refer to:
 Gabriel Correa (footballer)
 Gabriel Correa (model)